Harache may refer to:

 Harache family, a family of goldsmiths of Huguenot extraction
 Philippe Harache (1954-?), former deputy CEO of Eurocopter